Men of Action is a 1935 American drama film directed by Alan James from a screenplay by Forrest Sheldon, John W. Krafft, and Barry Barringer based on Peter B. Kyne's story, "The New Freedom." The film stars Frankie Darro, Roy Mason, and Barbara Worth.

Cast
 Frankie Darro as The engineer's friend
 Roy Mason as The construction engineer
 Barbara Worth
 Edwin Maxwell as The banker
 Fred Kohler as The foreman
 Arthur Hoyt
 John Ince
 Eddie Phillips
 Roger Williams
 Joseph Girard

References

1935 drama films
1935 films
American black-and-white films
Films directed by Alan James